Bonney Lake is a city in Pierce County, Washington. The population was 22,487 at the time of the 2020 census.

History
Bonney Lake was incorporated as a town on February 28, 1949, after the establishment of a co-op venture to bring electricity and tap water service to local residents. Several unsuccessful attempts were made to disincorporate the town from 1952 to 1972.

The City of Bonney Lake and the Greater Bonney Lake Historical Society placed in 13 historical markers between 2009 and 2015, including one for the Naches Trail, which was a well-used immigrant and military trail during the later half of the 1800s.

The 2020 Washington Labor Day fires forced the evacuation of an estimated 2,500 residences. The fire spread across 500 acres, and the evacuation lasted from Tuesday, September 8 until the following Sunday, September 12.

In January 2022, Michael McCullough was inaugurated as Bonney Lake's first new Mayor in fifteen years.

Geography
Bonney Lake is located at  (47.187019, −122.170035).

Demographics

2010
As of the census of 2010, there were 17,374 people living in Bonney Lake. There were 5,989 households and 4,632 families living in the city. The racial makeup of the city was 88.6% White, 1.1% African American, .8% Native American, 2.4% Asian, 0.5% Pacific Islander, 1.8% from other races, and 4.5% from two or more races. Hispanic or Latino of any race were 6.1% of the population.

There were 5,989 households, of which 44.5% had children under the age of 18 living with them, 61.0% were married couples living together, 10.1% had a female householder with no husband present, 6.3% had a male householder with no wife present, and 22.7% were non-families. 15.4% of all households were made up of individuals, and 4.1% had someone living alone who was 65 years of age or older. The average household size was 2.89 and the average family size was 3.20.

The median age in the city was 34.6 years. 27.2% of residents were under the age of 18; 7.8% were between the ages of 18 and 24; 30.8% were from 25 to 44; 26.5% were from 45 to 64; and 8.2% were 65 years of age or older. The gender makeup of the city was 49.4% male and 50.6% female.

2000 census
As of the census of 2000, there were 9,687 people, 3,266 households, and 2,583 families living in the city. The population density was 1,780.9 people per square mile (687.5/km2). There were 3,404 housing units at an average density of 625.8 per square mile (241.6/km2). The racial makeup of the city was 94.08% White, 0.60% African American, 1.02% Native American, 1.27% Asian, 0.07% Pacific Islander, 0.62% from other races, and 2.33% from two or more races. Hispanic or Latino of any race were 3.08% of the population.

There were 3,266 households, out of which 47.3% had children under the age of 18 living with them, 63.7% were married couples living together, 9.2% had a female householder with no husband present, and 20.9% were non-families. 13.6% of all households were made up of individuals, and 2.4% had someone living alone who was 65 years of age or older. The average household size was 2.96 and the average family size was 3.26.

In the city, the population was spread out, with 32.0% under the age of 18, 7.3% from 18 to 24, 35.7% from 25 to 44, 20.3% from 45 to 64, and 4.6% who were 65 years of age or older. The median age was 33 years. For every 100 females, there were 106.5 males. For every 100 females age 18 and over, there were 107.0 males.

The median income for a household in the city was $60,282, and the median income for a family was $62,644. Males had a median income of $46,813 versus $31,837 for females. The per capita income for the city was $21,371. About 3.0% of families and 4.0% of the population were below the poverty line, including 3.8% of those under age 18 and 5.3% of those age 65 or over.

Notable people
Jordin Andrade, Olympic Track & Field athlete who competed at the 2016 Summer Olympics.
 Dylan Gambrell, NHL player for the Ottawa Senators
 Dallas Jenkins, film and television director
 Megan Jendrick, Olympic swimming gold medalist
 Melanie Roach, Olympic weightlifter
 Kyle J. White, Medal of Honor recipient

References

External links

 City website

Cities in Washington (state)
Cities in Pierce County, Washington
Cities in the Seattle metropolitan area